David Ridings (born 27 February 1970) is an English former professional footballer who played in the Football League for Halifax Town, Lincoln City and Crewe Alexandra.

Playing career

Halifax Town
Ridings signed for Third Division club Halifax Town in January 1993, and he scored on his debut as Halifax picked up their first win in 13 games with 3–0 victory at Darlington.

Lincoln City
Fellow Third Division side Lincoln City bought Ridings for £10,000 in February 1994.

Leigh RMI
On 24 August 1996, he joined Leigh RMI just an hour before the transfer deadline, enabling him to make his debut for the club, as a substitute, in the 3–1 Northern Premier League Division One home defeat to Droylsden later that afternoon. He played over 200 games for The Railwaymen in nearly six years with the club.

Stalybridge Celtic
In April 2002, Ridings turned down the offer of a new 12-month contract with Leigh to join Stalybridge Celtic, linking up with former Leigh assistant manager David Miller and a number of ex-Hilton Park teammates. He made his debut in the 2–2 draw with Vauxhall Motors in opening game of the 2002–03 season and would go on to make a further 11 appearances for Celtic before leaving the club.

Honours

Club
Leigh RMI
President's Cup runner-up: 1998–99
Northern Premier League Premier Division: 1999–2000

Individual
Leigh RMI Players' Player of the Year: 2000–01

External links

Dave Ridings at ShaymenOnline.org
Dave Ridings at StalybridgeCeltic.co.uk

References

1970 births
People from Farnworth
Living people
Association football midfielders
English footballers
Curzon Ashton F.C. players
Macclesfield Town F.C. players
Halifax Town A.F.C. players
Lincoln City F.C. players
Ashton United F.C. players
Crewe Alexandra F.C. players
Hednesford Town F.C. players
Leigh Genesis F.C. players
Stalybridge Celtic F.C. players
English Football League players
National League (English football) players
Northern Premier League players